Al-Nasiriya Sports Club, often simply known as Al-Nasiriya SC, is an Iraqi football team based in An Nasiriyah, Dhi Qar Governorate.
The club plays in the Iraq Division One and was founded on 21 October 1961. An Nasiriyah FC is nicknamed Sons of Sumer.

The An Nasiriyah Stadium is where Al-Nasiriya SC play their home games. It is a multi-use stadium in An Nasiriyah, Iraq and has a maximum capacity of around 10,000.

Sponsors

Current technical staff 
{| class="toccolours"
!bgcolor=silver|Position
!bgcolor=silver|Name
!bgcolor=silver|Nationality
|- bgcolor=#eeeeee
|Manager:||Ali Wahaib||
|-bgcolor=#eeeeee
|Assistant Manager:||Aziz Abdul-Nabi||
|-
|Assistant Manager:||Jaleel Ibrahim||
|-bgcolor=#eeeeee
|Team supervisor:||Majid Awada||
|-
|U-19 Manager:||Abbas Fadl||
|-

Managerial history
  Ahmed Daham 
  Murtadha Ali
  Ali Jawad
  Ali Wahaib

References

External links
 Club page on Goalzz

1961 establishments in Iraq
Association football clubs established in 1961
Football clubs in Dhi Qar